The Gaumont-British Picture Corporation produced and distributed films and operated a cinema chain in the United Kingdom. It was established as an offshoot of the Gaumont Film Company of France.

Film production

Gaumont-British was founded in 1898 as the British subsidiary of the French Gaumont Film Company. It became independent of its French parent in 1922 when Isidore Ostrer acquired control of Gaumont-British. In 1927 the Ideal Film Company, a leading silent film maker, merged with Gaumont.

The company's Lime Grove Studios was used for film productions, including Alfred Hitchcock's adaptation of The 39 Steps (1935), while its Islington Studios made Hitchcock's The Lady Vanishes (1938). In the 1930s, the company employed 16,000 people. During her first attempt in 1933 at circumnavigation of the UK, kayaker Fridel Meyer gave lectures about her journey at various landing places, for the Gaumont-British Picture Corporation.

In the United States, Gaumont-British had its own distribution operation for its films until December 1938, when it outsourced distribution to 20th Century Fox. 

In 1941 the Rank Organisation bought Gaumont-British and its sister company Gainsborough Pictures. Rank also took control over rival cinema chain, Odeon Cinemas, the same year.

Gaumont-British and its sister company Gainsborough Pictures are now owned by Gregory Motton

Cinemas 

Gaumont-British were the first large British cinema chain controlling 180 cinemas by 1928 and up to 300 the following year. Fox Film Corporation indirectly acquired shares in the company to help with the expansion. Gaumont-British developed or acquired large "super-cinemas". The New Victoria (later Gaumont and finally Odeon) in Bradford opened in 1930, the Gaumont in Manchester opened in 1935, and the Gaumont State Cinema in Kilburn, London, opened in 1937. They also took over many smaller cinemas across the country, eventually owning 343 properties. One such property was the Holderness Hall in Hull, built by the pioneering William Morton in 1912 and managed by him until 1930, when he could no longer compete.

Many of the Gaumont cinemas had a theatre organ for entertainment before the show, in the intervals, or after the show. The name "Gaumont" was adopted to describe the style of the flat-top organ console case (originally for the Pavilion Theatre, Shepherd's Bush), for some Compton organs built from October 1931 to 1934.

Cinema exhibition in the UK was characterised by alignments between exhibitors and distributors. After the Odeon and Gaumont takeovers, Rank had access to the product of 20th Century-Fox, Paramount, Walt Disney, Columbia, Universal, United Artists, Samuel Goldwyn, RKO, Alexander Korda's London Films, Republic Pictures, British Lion Films, and its own film productions. Rivals ABC had only Warner Brothers, MGM, Monogram Pictures, and the productions of its parent company Associated British Picture Corporation (ABPC). Both cinema circuits also took films from smaller distributors. With ample supply of product, Rank maintained the separate Odeon and Gaumont release pattern for many years. Some Odeon cinemas were renamed Gaumont when transferred to Gaumont release. 

In 1948, Rank merged the management and booking operations of Odeon and Gaumont. As attendances declined during the 1950s, many cinemas on all circuits were closed and eventually the booking power of the Gaumont circuit declined. In January 1959, Rank restructured its exhibition operation and combined the best Gaumonts and the best Odeons in a new Rank release, while the rest were given a new "National" release. In 1961, Paramount objected to Rank consigning its Dean Martin comedy All in a Night's Work to the national circuit and henceforth switched its allegiance to the ABC circuit. With the continuing decline in attendance and cinema numbers, the National release died on its feet and henceforth there were two release patterns, Rank and ABC. There was no reason to perpetuate the Gaumont name, and in towns that lost their Odeon, the Gaumont was usually renamed Odeon within a couple of years of the latter's closure. Even so, the Gaumont name continued to linger until, in January 1987, the last Gaumont, in Doncaster, was renamed Odeon.

G.B. Equipments Ltd and G.B.-Bell and Howell 

G.B. Equipments Ltd, a subsidiary of Gaumont-British, made a number of 16-mm film sound projectors in Britain before and during the Second World War, including models such as the G.B.-Scope A and B, Grosvenor and G.B. K and L series.

After the war, G.B. Equipments Ltd decided not to manufacture models of its own. Instead they began to manufacture, under licence, models of American design by Bell & Howell. These models, branded as either G.B.-Bell & Howell or Bell & Howell-Gaumont in Great Britain, were identical to the American models except in model number. During the 1950s G.B.-Bell & Howell either manufactured or distributed a number of 8 mm and 16 mm cine-cameras and projectors.

G.B.-Kershaw and G.B.-Kalee 

In 1888 Abram Kershaw established a business in Leeds making photographic items, including lanterns and projection equipment. Kershaw produced cinema projectors under the Kalee trade name (from the initials of Kershaw, A, Leeds) from the 1910s. Later, the company became part of Amalgamated Photographic Manufacturers, forming the Kershaw-Soho Ltd group.

The brand Kalee continued to be used until the Kershaw group was acquired by Gaumont British to become G.B.-Kalee Ltd. Both GB-Kershaw and GB-Kalee were used as brand names for a range of 8-mm and 16-mm cine-cameras, movie projectors, slide projectors and still cameras. G.B.-Kalee was also the distributor in the United Kingdom for the 16-mm and 35-mm Arriflex cinema cameras, as well as a range of professional cinema projectors and sound equipment under the brand name Gaumont-Kalee.

See also 

 List of Gainsborough Pictures films

References

External links 

 Gaumont-British Picture Corporation Limited
 

Former cinema chains in the United Kingdom
Defunct mass media companies of the United Kingdom
Film production companies of the United Kingdom
Film distributors of the United Kingdom
1898 establishments in England
Entertainment companies established in 1898
British companies established in 1898
Gaumont Film Company